Alamdar-e Olya (also Romanized as ‘Alamdār-e ‘Olyā; also known as Alamdār, ‘Alamdār-e Bālā, and ‘Alamdār ‘Ūlīya) is a village in Muzaran Rural District, in the Central District of Malayer County, Hamadan Province, Iran. At the 2006 census, its population was 179, in 71 families.

References 

Populated places in Malayer County